The Central District of Pishva County is in Tehran province, Iran. At the National Census in 2006, its population (as a part of the former Pishva District of Varamin County) was 55,844 in 14,042 households. The following census in 2011 counted 61,545 people in 17,021 households, by which time the district had been separated from the county and Pishva County established. At the latest census in 2016, the district had 73,611 inhabitants in 22,068 households.

References 

Pishva County

Districts of Tehran Province

Populated places in Tehran Province

Populated places in Pishva County